Rob Henneveld (born 15 September 1963) is a Dutch judoka. He competed in the men's half-middleweight event at the 1984 Summer Olympics.

References

External links
 

1963 births
Living people
Dutch male judoka
Olympic judoka of the Netherlands
Judoka at the 1984 Summer Olympics
Sportspeople from Maassluis
20th-century Dutch people